Pablo Cedrón (January 7, 1958 – November 1, 2017) was an Argentine actor.

In 2005, he starred in the El Viento.

In 2006, he prominently featured in some 58 episodes of the TV series Sos mi vida as Félix Perez Garmendia 'Falucho'.

Filmography
El Habilitado (1971)
La Raulito (1975)
Entre el amor y el poder (1984) TV Series
El Juguete rabioso (1984)
Las Barras bravas (1985) as Roberto
Les Longs manteaux (1986) as Luis
Pinocho (1986)
Nico (1995) TV Series
90-60-90 modelos (1996) TV Series as Diego Nilson
Río escondido (1999) as Luis
Felicidades (2000) as Rodolfo
Campeones de la vida (1999) TV Series as Chavero (1999–2000)
Cabeza de tigre (2001) as French
En ausencia (2002)
Malandras (2003) TV Series
Mujeres asesinas TV episode
El Viento (2005) as Miguel Dufour
El Aura (2005) .... Sosa
Sin código (2005) (mini) TV Series as Carlos
Bendita vida (2006) TV Series
Sos mi vida as Félix Perez Garmendia 'Falucho' (58 episodes, 2006)
Lalola (2007) TV Series as Teo
The Appeared (2007)
Agnus Dei (2008)
Aballay, un hombre sin miedo (2010)
Boca de Pozo (2014) as Lucho

External links
 

1958 births
2017 deaths
Argentine male film actors
Argentine male television actors
People from Mar del Plata
Deaths from liver cancer